North Central Correctional Institution is a medium/minimum security prison located in Gardner, MA.   Within the facility are eighteen buildings, with a perimeter consisting of two chain-linked fences topped with razor wire. The perimeter is manned by three towers and foot patrols of K9 teams. It is under the jurisdiction of the Massachusetts Department of Correction.  NCCI is considered a low medium due to the interior design of the facility.  It is a converted state hospital facility with many dormitory style units.  The inmate population consists of adult male felons serving sentences ranging from 2.5 years to life. On January 6, 2020, there were 974 inmates in general population beds.

Covid cases 
Pursuant to the Supreme Judicial Court's April 3, 2020 Opinion and Order in the Committee for Public Counsel Services v. Chief Justice of the Trial Court, SJC-12926 matter, as amended on April 10, April 28 and June 23, 2020 (the “Order”), the Special Master posts weekly reports which are located on the SJC website here for COVID testing and cases for each of the correctional facilities administered by the Department of Correction and each of the county Sheriffs’ offices. The SJC Special master link above has the most up to date information reported by the correctional agencies and is posted for the public to view.

1 inmate at NCCI has died from Covid.

Prison Address 
NCCI/Gardner 
500 Colony Road 
PO Box 466 
Gardner, MA 01440

References

External links
Official website

1981 establishments in Massachusetts
Buildings and structures in Worcester County, Massachusetts
Prisons in Massachusetts